José Hernández may refer to:

Arts and entertainment
 José Hernández (writer) (1834–1886), Argentine writer
 Pepe Hern (José Hernández Bethencourth, 1927–2009), American actor
 José Hernández, American singer (born 1940), better known as Little Joe
 José Hernández (painter) (1944–2013), Spanish painter
 José Hernández (musician) (born 1958), Mexican musician
 Chef Pepín (José Hernández), Cuban-born, American TV cook

Politicians
 José Conrado Hernández (1849–1932), Chief Justice of the Supreme Court of Puerto Rico
 José Manuel Hernández (1853–1921), Venezuelan caudillo, army general and politician
 José Alarcón Hernández (born 1945), Mexican politician
 José María Hernández (1959–2015), Spanish politician

Science and academia
 José Gregorio Hernández (1864–1919), Venezuelan physician
 José M. Hernández (born 1962), American astronaut

Sportspeople

Association football
 Cheche Hernández (born 1956), Colombian football manager
 José Hernández (footballer, born 1961), Venezuelan football manager and former footballer
 José Alberto Hernández (born 1977), Mexican football midfielder
 José Hernández (footballer, born 1994), Mexican football midfielder
 José Romario Hernández (born 1994), Mexican football winger
 José Antonio Hernández (born 1995), Mexican football midfielder
 José Hernández (footballer, born 1996), Mexican football midfielder
 José Hernández (footballer, born 1997), Venezuelan football left-back for La Equidad
 José Santiago Hernández (born 1997), Mexican football goalkeeper
 José Hernández (soccer, born 2000), Canadian soccer forward

Other sports
 José Hernández (baseball) (born 1969), Puerto Rican Major League Baseball player
José Hernández (pitcher)
 José Hernández (boxer) (born 1976), Mexican professional boxer
 José Carlos Hernández (born 1978), Spanish long-distance runner
 José Hernández (handballer) (born 1979), Cuban handball player
 José Hernández-Fernández (born 1990), Dominican Republic tennis player
 José Tito Hernández (born 1995), Colombian road cyclist
 Cheo Hernández (José Hernández, 1894–?), Negro leagues pitcher

Other uses
 José Hernández (Buenos Aires Underground), a metro station in Buenos Aires